Career management is the combination of structured planning and the active management choice of one's own professional career. Career Management is an umbrella term that covers Career Planning & Career Development on an individual level or at an organizational level. Career management also covers talent management, as part of a talent retention strategy. Career management was first defined in a social work doctoral thesis by Mary Valentich as the implementation of a career strategy through the application of career tactics in relation to chosen career orientation (Valentich & Gripton, 1978). Career orientation referred to the overall design or pattern of one's career, shaped by particular goals and interests and identifiable by particular positions that embody these goals and interests. Career strategy pertains to the individual's general approach to the realization of career goals, and to the specificity of the goals themselves. Two general strategy approaches are adaptive and planned. Career tactics are actions to maintain oneself in a satisfactory employment situation. Tactics may be more or less assertive, with assertiveness in the work situation referring to actions taken to advance one's career interests or to exercise one's legitimate rights while respecting the rights of others.

Valentich and Gripton defined success as managing one's career effectively through the attainment of desired positions and other rewards. The outcome of successful career management should include personal fulfillment, work–life balance, goal achievement, and financial security.

A career includes all types of employment ranging from semi-skilled through skilled, and semi-professional to professional. Careers have often been restricted to an employment commitment to a single trade skill, profession or business firm for the entire working life of a person. In recent years, however, a career  now includes changes or modifications in employment during the foreseeable future.

The following classification system with minor variations is widely used:

 Development of overall goals and objectives,
 Development of a strategy (a general means to accomplish the selected goals/objectives),
 Development of the specific means (policies, rules, procedures and activities) to implement the strategy, and
Systematic evaluation of the progress toward the achievement of the selected goals/objectives to modify the strategy, if necessary.

Goals or objectives development

The career management process begins with setting goals/objectives.  A relatively specific goal/objective must be formulated.  This task may be quite difficult when the individual lacks knowledge of career opportunities and/or is not fully aware of their talents and abilities.  However, the entire career management process is based on the establishment of defined goals/objectives whether specific or general in nature. Utilizing career assessments may be a critical step in identifying opportunities and career paths that most resonate with someone.  Career assessments can range from quick and informal to more in-depth.  Regardless of the ones you use, you will need to evaluate them.  Most assessments found today for free (although good) do not offer an in-depth evaluation.

The time horizon for the achievement of the selected goals or objectives - short term, medium-term or long term - will have a major influence on their formulation.

 Short-term goals (one or two years) are usually specific and limited in scope.  Short-term goals are easier to formulate. Make sure they are achievable and relate to your longer term career goals.
 Intermediate goals (3 to 20 years) tend to be less specific and more open ended than short-term goals. Both intermediate and long-term goals are more difficult to formulate than short-term goals because there are so many unknowns about the future.
 Long-term goals (Over 20 years), of course, are the most fluid of all.  Lack of life experience and knowledge about potential opportunities and pitfalls make the formulation of long-term goals/objectives very difficult. Long-range goals/objectives, however, may be easily modified as additional information is received without a great loss of career efforts because of experience/knowledge transfer from one career to another.
 Making career choices and decisions – the traditional focus of career interventions. The changed nature of work means that individuals may have to revisit this process more frequently now than in the past.
 Managing the organizational career – concerns the career management tasks of individuals within the workplace, such as decision-making, life-stage transitions, dealing with stress etc.
 Managing 'boundaryless' careers – refers to skills needed by workers whose employment is beyond the boundaries of a single organization, a workstyle common among, for example, artists and designers.
 Taking control of one's personal development – as employers take less responsibility, employees need to take control of their own development in order to maintain and enhance their employability.

Other elements include:
 Career change

Career planning
Career planning is a subset of career management.  Career planning applies the concepts of Strategic planning and Marketing to taking charge of one's professional future. Career is an ongoing process and so it needs to be assessed on continuous basis. This process of re-assessing individual learning and development over a period of time is called Career Planning.  According to Mondy and Noe - " Career planning is an ongoing process whereby an individual sets career goals and identifies the means to achieve them."

Process of career planning
Career planning is the continuous process of:

 thinking about your interests, values, skills and preferences;
 exploring the life, work and learning options available to you;
 ensuring that your work fits with your personal circumstances; and
 continuously fine-tuning your work and learning plans to help you manage the changes in your life and the world of work.

6 Steps for Career Planning

Step 1: Explore Career Options 
Use career assessment tools to explore occupations further so that you can better utilize guidance from career professionals. This stage helps make you aware of the many possibilities that exist. In addition to learning position titles, you will also discover the skills, educational requirements, and personal attributes needed to be successful in various fields. Gathering this information helps identify jobs, and careers that would match your interests skills, abilities and personality.

Step 2: Conduct Field Research 
This stage is useful in deciding between different fields to pursue. Ideally meet with people in different positions or industries that you are interested in and ask them questions about their job. This is also the first step in starting to build a professional network.

Step 3: Determine Your Job Target 
Set some goals. Your Job Target is the specific industry and position you choose to pursue. It may also include geographic location. Your Job Target can change as you gain more experience and knowledge about yourself.

Step 4: Build Your Credentials and Resume 
This stage is ongoing and the more you build your credentials, the better your resume becomes. A great resume leads to interviews and offers. The best ways to build your credentials and knowledge are by:

 Doing internships related to your Job Target
 Taking classes and attending seminars related to your Job Target
 Reading books, journals, and magazines related to your Job Target
 Joining professional associations or clubs on campus related to your Job Target

Step 5: Prepare for Your Job Search 
This stage requires researching companies and organizations you want to work for and establishing if you have any leads there ie if you know anyone that already works there. Learn to write calling scripts and develop tactics for approaching employers other than looking at advertisements (which seldom bring quick results).  In addition, educate yourself regarding interviewing and salary negotiations before you meet employers.

Step 6: Launch Your Job Search 
Writing a targeted resume is important to show employers how your skills relate to their specific needs. Set aside the time to make calls, write cover letters and thank you letters, conduct interviews, and do research. Be creative with the approaches you use and remember to ask yourself, "Will this help me to stand out from my competition?" Lastly, consistently update your resume with any new skills, knowledge, and experience

See also
Career
Career Development
Job interview
Résumé
KUDOS

References 

 
 
 

Valentich, Mary & Gripton, James (1978). "Sexism and sex differences in career management of social workers. The Social Science Journal. 15(2), 101-111.

Career development